Don Hammond may refer to:

 Don Hammond (baseball), Americal baseball player
 Don Hammond (Australian footballer) (1922–2005), Australian rules footballer
 Don Hammond (rugby league) (–2022), New Zealand rugby league footballer